Joe O'Connor is a Gaelic footballer. He plays for the Austin Stacks club in midfield and at senior level for the Kerry county team.

Though he never started a game for Kerry, O'Connor was named senior captain for the 2022 season (replacing Paul Murphy), in a year when Kerry won the 2022 All-Ireland Senior Football Championship Final. and was injured. He formerly played rugby with Munster.

References

Year of birth missing (living people)
Living people
Austin Stacks Gaelic footballers
Kerry inter-county Gaelic footballers
Gaelic footballers who switched code